Malcolm David Kelley (born May 12, 1992), sometimes credited as just Malcolm Kelley, is an American rapper, singer, songwriter and actor best known for portraying the character Walt Lloyd on the ABC series Lost and as one half of the pop duo MKTO.

Career

Acting
Kelley's first major acting role was in the 2002 film Antwone Fisher, in which he played the title character as a child. Prior to this, he appeared in several small television roles in programs such as Malcolm in the Middle and Judging Amy. His next film role was You Got Served, in which he was cast in the supporting role of Lil' Saint.

In 2004, he was cast to play Walt in the TV show Lost. A regular cast member in the show's first season (2004–2005), he appeared only occasionally thereafter due to a dramatic growth spurt. He returned for an appearance in "Through the Looking Glass", Lost's third season finale, and twice more in the fourth season, with the episodes "Meet Kevin Johnson" and "There's No Place Like Home", and reprised his role in the fifth season with the episode "The Life and Death of Jeremy Bentham". He reprised the role of Walt a final time in the Season 6 DVD box set mini-episode "The New Man in Charge".

Following his departure from the main cast of Lost, Kelley appeared in several television roles, including the recurring character of Benjamin Cooley on Saving Grace.

In 2010, he appeared in the lead role of Finn on the TeenNick program Gigantic. The show was canceled after one season in 2011.

In 2014, he appeared in a guest role as himself and Tony Oller on The Thundermans as MKTO.

In 2017, he played Black in the film True to the Game and Michael Clark in Detroit.

Music
In 2012, Kelley and his former Gigantic co-star Tony Oller formed the pop duo MKTO. They were signed to Columbia Records. In 2013 Kelley recorded together with Celine Dion, the song "save your soul" for Dion's late 2013 release "loved me back to life". But their duet version was only included on the album's vinyl version. On the regular version, save your soul only contains Dion's vocals.

The duo's debut self-titled album, was released on April 1, 2014. Their single "Classic" was a major hit in the summer of 2014, reaching number 14 on the Billboard Hot 100.

Filmography

Film

Television

References

External links

1992 births
Living people
21st-century American male actors
21st-century American singers
African-American male actors
American male child actors
American male television actors
American singer-songwriters
American male singer-songwriters
People from Greater Los Angeles
21st-century American male singers
21st-century African-American male singers